Hoeneodes vittatella is a species of snout moth in the genus Hoeneodes. It was described by Émile Louis Ragonot in 1887. It is found in Siberia.

References

Moths described in 1887
Phycitinae